Phyllophaga tarsalis is a species in the genus Phyllophaga ("May beetles"), in the subfamily Melolonthinae ("May beetles and junebugs").
It is found in North America.

References

Further reading
 Arnett, R.H. Jr., M. C. Thomas, P. E. Skelley and J. H. Frank. (eds.). (2002). American Beetles, Volume II: Polyphaga: Scarabaeoidea through Curculionoidea. CRC Press LLC, Boca Raton, FL.
 Arnett, Ross H. (2000). American Insects: A Handbook of the Insects of America North of Mexico. CRC Press.
 Evans, Arthur V. (2003). "A checklist of the New World chafers (Coleoptera: Scarabaeidae: Melolonthinae)".
 Richard E. White. (1983). Peterson Field Guides: Beetles. Houghton Mifflin Company.

Melolonthinae
Beetles described in 1908